Chapter Seven is the seventh album by Australian Idol 2006 winner Damien Leith and released on November 1, 2013. It was his first album released via Social Family Records. The album spawned three singles.

Background
Following the release of his 2012 album, Now & Then, Leith and Sony Music Australia parted ways and Leith took time out to write and record. Leith contacted producer and sound engineer David Nicholas (who has collaborated with musicians such as Elton John and INXS), who mixed the album and co-produced some of the tracks.

Gary Clark (collaborated with Natalie Imbruglia, The Wanted, The Veronicas) and Jon Vella (Meat Loaf, Ricky Martin) also contributed to the album along with Joe Melson. Damien said of this collaboration:  "It’s been an absolute honour to work with Joe whose [sic] become a close friend and mentor".

Leith recorded the album in a small studio that he helped to build, and he did the recording and production work himself.

“It’s a fully independent album, this one,” he said. “This is the first time I have really done it from start to end, every aspect of it. It has been brilliant, there has been lots to learn and a lot of hits and misses along the way. I think that’s why I’m especially proud of this one.” 

Leith said: “In the album I cover a lot of different themes, love, loss and everything in between. But I’ve tried to approach them from a positive outlook. It’s true to the style people know me for."

Leith performed "Without a Fight" live on The Morning Show on November 5, 2013.

Reviews
Maggie Sapet from Myamn said: "The acoustic pop folk album that tells tales of love, life and everything in between uses predominantly acoustic guitar and drums to create songs that make you think and that you can relate to at the same time. After all, it is an album all about taking a leap of faith and believing in yourself. This is not only true for the album’s themes, but also Leith’s decision to go independent."  

The Sound of Oz reviewed the album positively, saying, "His distinctive soaring voice is in fine form, but he’s learned to reign in his falsetto and use it only for effect. I’m not sure whether that’s about Damien developing as an artist, or if he simply knows that he doesn’t need to deliver the big crowd-pleasing notes that inspire people to pick up the phone anymore. Either way, the vocal performances in Chapter Seven feel really natural and honest." and "Leith wears his heart on his sleeve, and that’s so compelling. It’s impossible not to like an artist that so freely shares himself with his audience. He may not be reaching the masses that he did during his time on Idol, but with Chapter Seven Damien rewards anyone that’s willing to listen.

Track listing
 "Time to Go" (3:38)
 "Last Sad Song" (4:23)
 "Halfway Heart" (3:29)
 "I Can Stop You Crying" (4:11)
 "You and I" (3:15) 
 "See You Again" (3:47) 
 "Without a Fight" (3:27)
 "Never Forget" (3:56) 
 "Stronger Than Superman" (3:46) 
 "Faith in Me" (3:43)
 "A Million Reasons" (2:56) 
 "Lonely Nights" (2:55)

Charts
Chapter Seven debuted and peaked on the ARIA charts at number 57.

Weekly charts

Without a Fight Tour
A national tour was announced in August 2013, titled Without a Fight which is the lead single from the album.
 Thu 31 - Oct 13 - Ellington Jazz Club, Perth. 
 Fri 01 - Nov 13 - Ellington Jazz Club, Perth. 
 Sat 02 - Nov 13 - The Tavern, Joondalup. 
 Sun 03-Nov-13 - Mandurah Bowling and Recreation Club, Mandurah.  
 Thu 07-Nov-13 - The Sound Lounge, The Gold Coast. 
 Fri 08-Nov-13 - The Mon Komo Hotel, Redcliffe.
 Sat 09-Nov-13 - Brisbane Broncos League Club, Brisbane.
 Sun 10-Nov-13 - Victoria Point Shark Club, Brisbane East.
 Wed 13-Nov-13 - Roth's Wine Bar, Mudgee.
 Thu 14-Nov-13 - Clarendon Guesthouse, Katoomba.
 Fri 15-Nov-13 - The Brass Monkey, Cronulla.
 Sat 16-Nov-13 - The Heritage Hotel, Wollongong.  
 Fri 22-Nov-13 – Country Club Casino, Launceston.
 Sat 23-Nov-13 – Wrest Point Entertainment Centre, Hobart.
 Fri 29-Nov-13 - The Abbey, Canberra.
 Sat 30-Nov-13 - Thornbury Theatre, Melbourne.  
 Fri 06-Dec-13- Dural Country Club, Dural.
 Sat 07-Dec-13 - Shoalhaven Entertainment Centre, Nowra.
 Sun 08-Dec-13 - Speers Point Park, Newcastle.
 Thu 12-Dec-13 Taree Bean Bar & Cafe. Taree
 Fri 13-Dec-13 - The Pier, Port Macquarie.
 Sat 14-Dec-13 - The Basement, Sydney.

Due to high demand, Leith returned for more shows during 2014.

'Without a Fight Encore 2014' tour dates: 

 September 5 - Bennett's Lane Jazz Club, Melbourne
 September 6 - Bennett's Lane Jazz Club, Melbourne
 September 17 - Swings Bar, Margaret River.
 September 18 - Friend's Restaurant, Perth
 September 19 - The Boab Tavern, High Wycombe.
 September 20 - Mandurah Bowling and Recreation Club, Mandurah.  
 September 26 - Seymour Centre, Sydney
 October 17 - Rooty Hill RSL, Rooty Hill
 October 18 - Asquith Leagues Club, Asquith

References

2013 albums
Damien Leith albums
Social Family Records albums